Cruz v. Arizona, 598 U.S. ___ (2023), was a United States Supreme Court case related to habeas corpus.

Background 

In 2003, John Montenegro Cruz shot Tucson, Arizona police officer Patrick Hardesty to death. He was convicted of first-degree murder and sentenced to death in state court in 2005. In the penalty phase of the trial, Cruz was unable to inform the jury that Arizona had previously abolished parole for felons, so he would either be sentenced to life in prison without parole, or death, nullifying the state's evidence of any future danger he posed to the public. This procedural protection was recognized in the 1994 Simmons v. South Carolina decision. On appeal, the Arizona Supreme Court upheld Cruz's conviction, and rejected his argument that his trial violated Simmons. His first state petition for post-conviction relief was denied, as was his federal habeas corpus petition. In 2016, the Supreme Court of the United States rejected the Arizona Supreme Court's reasoning in Lynch v. Arizona, holding Simmons did require juries be offered such instructions in the state. Cruz filed a second state post-conviction petition soon after, and it was rejected in 2021.

Cruz filed a petition for a writ of certiorari, asking whether Lynch applies to cases pending on collateral review.

Supreme Court of the United States

The Supreme Court granted certiorari on March 28, 2022, limited to the question of whether the judgment of the Arizona Supreme Court rested on an adequate and independent state-law ground. On February 22, 2023, the Court reversed the Arizona Supreme Court.

References

External links 
 

2023 in United States case law
United States Supreme Court cases
United States Supreme Court cases of the Roberts Court
United States habeas corpus case law